Aeroland Airways was a Greek charter airline based in Athens, Greece. It operated cargo flights between Athens and several domestic destinations. Aeroland was founded in 2005 and suspended operations in late 2012.

Fleet
The Aeroland Airways fleet:
1 × Bombardier Dash 8 Q100
4 × Cessna 208 Caravan

External links
Aeroland Airways
Aeroland Airways amateur fleet list

References 

Defunct airlines of Greece
Airlines established in 2005
Airlines disestablished in 2012
Greek companies established in 2005